Wesley Koolhof and Kevin Krawietz defeated Sander Gillé and Joran Vliegen in the final, 4–6, 6–4, [10–5], to win the doubles title at the 2021 Bavarian International Tennis Championships. It was Koolhof's seventh individual career ATP Tour doubles title and Krawietz's fifth.

Frederik Nielsen and Tim Pütz were the defending champions from when the tournament was last held in 2019, but they competed at the simultaneous Estoril Open instead.

Seeds

Draw

Draw

References

External links
 Main draw

Doubles